Mauritz Stiller (born Moshe Stiller, 17 July 1883 – 18 November 1928) was a Swedish film director of Finnish Jewish origin, best known for discovering Greta Garbo and bringing her to America.

Stiller had been a pioneer of the Swedish film industry, writing and directing many short films from 1912. When Metro-Goldwyn-Mayer invited him to Hollywood as a director, he arrived with his new discovery Greta Gustafsson, whose screen name Greta Garbo is believed to have been his suggestion.

After frequent disagreements with studio executives at MGM and Paramount Pictures, Stiller returned to Sweden, where he died soon afterwards.

Life
Moshe Stiller was born in Helsinki. His family was of Ashkenazi Jewish heritage, having lived in Russia and Poland before settling in Finland, these countries being part of the Russian Empire. After his father's death when he was four, his mother committed suicide. He was raised by family friends. From an early age, Stiller was interested in acting. His talents did not go unnoticed, and soon Stiller was offered the opportunity to practice and display his acting skills in the theaters of Helsinki and Åbo in Finland.

Drafted into the army of Czar Nicholas II — Finland was at the time an autonomous Grand Duchy of Finland, part of Russia — rather than report for duty he fled the country for exile, and settled in Sweden. He became a Swedish citizen in 1921.

Career
By 1912, Stiller had become involved with Sweden's rapidly developing silent film industry. He began by writing scripts, acting and directing in short films but within a few years gave up acting to devote his time to writing and directing. He was soon directing feature-length productions, and his 1918 work Thomas Graals bästa barn (Thomas Graal's First Child), starring Karin Molander, and with Victor Sjöström in the leading role, received much acclaim.

By 1920, having directed more than 35 films, including Sir Arne's Treasure and Erotikon, Stiller was a leading figure in Swedish filmmaking. He also directed The Blizzard starring a young Einar Hanson and based on the Selma Lagerlöf novel En herrgårdssägen.

Stiller and Garbo

At the Royal Dramatic Theatre in Stockholm, he met a young actress named Greta Gustafsson whom he cast in an important but secondary role in his film, Gösta Berlings saga (The Atonement of Gosta Berling), and who some have said gave her the stage name Greta Garbo. For Stiller, the screen presence of the 18-year-old actress led to him bringing her and Hanson to the United States after he accepted an offer from Louis B. Mayer to direct for Metro-Goldwyn-Mayer.

In Hollywood, Mauritz Stiller was assigned to direct The Temptress (1926), Garbo's second film with MGM, but he could not deal with the studio structure. After repeated arguments with MGM executives, he was replaced on the film by Fred Niblo, and his contract with the studio terminated. Stiller immediately was hired by Paramount Pictures, where he made three successful films, but he was let go a second time while directing his fourth film because of his continuing disagreements with studio bosses.

Death and legacy
Stiller returned to Sweden in 1927 and died the following year from pleurisy at the age of 45. He was interred in the Norra begravningsplatsen in Stockholm.

Stiller's contribution to the motion picture industry was recognized in 1960 with a star on the Hollywood Walk of Fame at 1713 Vine Street. Originally his star was listed erroneously as "Maurice Diller" and was not corrected until the late 1980s. In Kristianstad, a monument was erected in his honor.

In the Badehotellet episode "Feriebarnet", Kitty tells Frigh that Stiller wrote her a letter and wants to take her to Hollywood. When Fright admits he doesn't know who he is, Kitty replies that Stiller discovered Garbo and shows him a newspaper clipping of the photo of Garbo and Stiller posing on the deck of the SS Drottningholm.

Filmography

References

External links

Original Photoplay Interview with Greta Garbo, where she talks about her first meeting with Stiller: "I started trembling all over."
Literature on Mauritz Stiller

1883 births
1928 deaths
Artists from Helsinki
People from Uusimaa Province (Grand Duchy of Finland)
Finnish Jews
Finnish people of Polish-Jewish descent
Finnish people of Russian-Jewish descent
Swedish people of Finnish-Jewish descent
Finnish film directors
Swedish film directors
LGBT Jews
LGBT film directors
Finnish emigrants to Sweden
Burials at Norra begravningsplatsen
Swedish Ashkenazi Jews